Dambdaf is a village in Sistan and Baluchestan Province, Iran.

Dambdaf may also refer to:
 Dambdaf-e Miran
 Dambdaf-e Moradi
 Dambdaf-e Osman